Nanaj (also Romanized as Nannaj and Nanoj; also known as Nahenjeh) is a village in Jowkar Rural District, Jowkar District, Malayer County, Hamadan Province, Iran. At the 2006 census, its population was 778, in 198 families.

The local language of the village is a Persian variety influenced by Kurdish and Luri.

References 

Populated places in Malayer County